Record Collector is a British monthly music magazine. It was founded in 1980 and distributes worldwide.

History

The early years
The first standalone issue of Record Collector was published in March 1980, though its history stretches back further. In 1963, publisher Sean O'Mahony (alias Johnny Dean) had launched an official Beatles magazine, The Beatles Book. Although it shut down in 1969, The Beatles Book reappeared in 1976 due to popular demand.

Through the late-1970s, the small ads section of The Beatles Book became an increasingly popular avenue through which collectors could make contact and buy, sell, or trade Beatles records. Reflecting a burgeoning collecting scene in the 1970s, as time went by, the adverts were becoming dominated by traders who were interested in rare vinyl unassociated with the Beatles. In September 1979, The Beatles Book came with a record collecting supplement, and the response was positive enough for O'Mahony to launch Record Collector as a separate entity in March 1980.

Taking off
By June 1980, Record Collector was a glossy A5 publication which ran to no more than 100 pages. With the addition of another editorial staff member – Peter Doggett, who stayed with the magazine for almost 20 years – Record Collector began to take shape and assume its own identity. Aimed at the collectors' market, early issues focused largely on the music of collectable artists from the 1950s, 1960s and 1970s.

Uniquely, Record Collector features consisted of both prose pieces on the history of the artist, and detailed discographies of their UK releases. These discographies would provide all the information needed for collectors to pore over, and which enabled them to differentiate between different pressings of supposedly identical releases – catalogue numbers, release dates and distinguishing features of the records and sleeves themselves. In particular, they would also include a valuation of each record, so that dealers and collectors had a springboard to work from.

Collectors outside London found themselves limited by their situation. The mail order listings in Record Collector were important, and one of the few places for buyers and sellers to make contact with each other. At its height, this section was up to half of the publication. However, at the turn of the 21st century with the success of selling to consumers on-line via sites such as eBay, many sellers now use this type of method and the amount of listings has greatly declined.

Aim
Since the turn of the millennium, many monthly publications such as Mojo and Uncut started to accept AOR and progressive rock music as viable musical genres.

In the pre-internet days, Record Collector was the only way of reaching many genuine collectors and fans across the country. It sought to provide a publication for fans of the music, regardless of style, genre or mass popularity. Many Record Collector features were written by the collectors and fans themselves, who knew the facts and had the passion that the magazine required.

Standing
With an 'open door' editorial policy, nostalgic outlook and focus on discographies and collectability, Record Collector has created a unique identity. Throughout the early 1980s, rival publications like Greatest Hits and the Record Hunter supplement of Vox were launched, but none of them lasted very long. It was not until the monthly Q magazine launched in 1986 – its focus on older music fans who were buying the new CD technology of the time – that a major competitor entered the music monthlies sector. Subsequently, in the 1990s, Classic Rock, Uncut and Mojo (who, in 2001, launched Mojo Collections as a direct competitor, though that folded after six issues and was incorporated into the main magazine) and myriad other monthly titles started, taking as their focus the nostalgic, or retrospective, outlook pioneered by Record Collector in 1980.

Influence
In 1981, Record Collector introduced a review column focusing on an album of the month. This was before the CD boom of the mid-80s had created a widespread demand for back catalogue product, and at a time where the weekly music press had a purely contemporary outlook. The reissue review column encouraged many record companies to begin putting out reissues on a small scale, because they knew Record Collector would cover them and help generate profit.

When the advent of the CD meant that many collectors needed their favourite music issued on the new format, Record Collector was already covering reissued albums. More recently, there has been an upsurge in limited edition vinyl and CD releases, while – much as the picture disc, popular in the 1980s, has become a huge source of collectability – many modern vinyl releases are making limited and coloured formats fashionable once again, aiming themselves directly at the collecting market that Record Collector helped to establish and serve.

Currently
In 2003, Record Collector became a full colour publication – marking the fact with a psychedelic special – and printing 13 issues a year. The magazine was updated steadily by editor-In-chief Alan Lewis, former editor of Sounds, NME, Black Music, founding editor of Kerrang! and involved in the launches of both Uncut and Loaded. Lewis left in April 2011 and was replaced by Ian McCann, formerly of NME, Black Echoes and The Independent. His debut came with an issue focused on "the 51 Best Investments in vinyl" which drew press coverage worldwide. The magazine has since embraced multimedia, launching Facebook and Twitter feeds, and has broadened its outlook slightly, offering comment on subjects such as Amy Winehouse's death and music linked to the 2011 England riots. In 2017 McCann stepped down as editor and was succeeded by Paul Lester.

Record Collector continues to publish retrospective features, full discographies and in depth interviews. Its outlook has expanded to embrace the phenomenon of collecting via the internet, whether it be through online trading, or downloading music. Record Collector also includes Q&A pages where readers can have questions about their rare and obscure records answered; some of the largest news and reviews sections in music print; one of the few fanzine review columns in print; a focus on curio releases from around the world; interviews with a variety of collectors, who talk through their personal collections; and monthly features on eBay and record fairs.
Record Collector is an important magazine because it provides a sense of history to the scene. It assesses the importance of artists' contribution to music, regardless of whether they are flavour of the month. As a result, Record Collector has both rescued various artists' careers and instilled a sense in the reader that the quality of the music and the integrity of the artist is what really counts... a human voice in a corporate environment. --Arthur Brown

The Rare Record Price Guide

Origins
In 1987, Record Collector published its first standalone price guide – a slim publication, designed to be a quick and easy reference book for collectors and dealers to source information for around 2,000 highly collectible artists.

Five years later, in late 1992, the first edition of the Rare Record Price Guide proper was issued, which listed 60,000 rare and collectible records from a diverse array of artists. Since then, the RRPG has continued to expand and is now in its seventh edition, with over 100,000 entries that cover all musical genres. Since its inception, it has established itself as the leading book of its kind.

From 2000 to 2005, the RRPG was edited by Jack Kane, a writer and expert who regularly appeared as a special guest on Marc Riley's BBC 6 Music radio programme Mint. Kane suffered from depression and killed himself in 2005 at the age of 40: Record Collector ran a full-page tribute to him, with contributions by its staff.

The RRPG
The Rare Record Price Guide features an alphabetical list of all the artists with notable collectables, and then lists each collectible release in chronological order. It includes 78rpm records, 7”, 10” and 12” vinyl singles and EPs, vinyl LPs, and cassette and CD singles and albums.

Each release format has a minimum value, and if a particular release reaches or exceeds that, the RRPG features it, giving the entry full label, catalogue number, A-side and B-side listings (where applicable), distinctive features of the item and price information.

To that it puts a fair, accurate and realistic valuation on each record, which serves as a barometer for buyers and sellers of rare records. All of its valuations are for records in excellent, or 'Mint' condition. Where there are different versions of the same record (for example, a limited number may have been issued in a picture sleeve), then two prices are given, to reflect that difference.

The RRPG is not designed to be a complete discography of a given artist, but a reference for collectors and dealers of collectible records. Its focus is on music released from the 1950s onwards, including various artists compilations and soundtracks. For the majority of the listings, the records have to have been made commercially available in the UK. Exceptions include:

Releases from the Republic Of Ireland, which were imported into Britain, but not officially issued.
'Export Releases' manufactured in the UK in the 1950s and 1960s, and distributed to countries that did not have their own pressing plants.
Records, flexidiscs, cassettes or CDs included as freebies with magazines, books or other records.
Promotional releases, demos, test pressings and acetate recordings where they have been made available to the public, contain unique material and/or packaging, or are so important/well known among collectors that they warrant inclusion.

The RRPG Online
In the April 2010 issue of Record Collector it was announced the Rare Record Price Guide was going online. The online database contains all the latest updates, a live currency converting function, more photos and the ability for users to submit their own content.

Additionally, users can get total collection valuations by adding records in the database to a private "My Collection" section of the site.

Record Collector 100 Greatest... books
In 2005, Record Collector began a series of books that sought to present the top 100 most collectible records of a given genre of music. Each book has been written by a specialist in that field, and investigates the story behind each records in the Top 100, along with accompanying record and label images.

So far, two books have been published, 100 Greatest Psychedelic Records and 100 Greatest Rock'N'Roll Records.

Distinguished Record Collector contributors – past and present
Kingsley Abbott (author of Back to the Beach: A Brian Wilson and the Beach Boys Reader and Calling Out Around the World: A Motown Reader)
Keith Badman (editor of The Beatles Diary and co-writer of Rock On Wood: Ronnie Wood – The Origin of a Rock'N'Roll Face)
Laurence Cane-Honeysett (co-author of Young, Gifted & Black – The Trojan Records Story)
Peter Checksfield (author of Channelling The Beat!: The Ultimate Guide to UK '60s Pop on TV,Look Wot They Dun!: The Ultimate Guide to UK Glam Rock on TV in the '70s and The Beatles - Tell Me What You See: The Ultimate Guide to John, Paul, George & Ringo on TV and Video) 
Alan Clayson (author of Serge Gainsbourg: View from the Exterior and Keith Moon: Instant Party)
Andy Davis (author of The Beatles Files)
Chas De Whalley (author of Big Noise: BPI Guide to Working in the Music Industry)
Peter Doggett (author of Christie's Rock & Pop Memorabilia, Are You Ready for the Country, You Never Give Me Your Money and Electric Shock: From the Gramophone to the iPhone: 125 Years of Pop Music)
Daryl Easlea (author of Everybody Dance: Chic and the Politics of Disco, BBC Music  editor)
Pat Gilbert (author of Passion Is a Fashion: The Real Story of the Crash)
Joe Geesin (editor of fanclubs for Nazareth, Cozy Powell and Paul Samson; editor of the Rare Record Price Guide 2002)
Michael Heatley (author of John Peel: A Life in Music and The Complete Deep Purple)
Patrick Humphries (author of Nick Drake: The Biography, Pink Floyd and Richard Thompson: Strange Affair)
Ken Hunt (co-compiler of The Rough Guide to World Music, contributor to The Rough Guide to Rock and The Oxford Dictionary of National Biography)
Mark Jones (author of Bristol Folk and The Famous Charisma Discography: contributor to The Rough Guide to Rock and The Granary Club: The Rock Years)
Jack Kane (editor of Record Collector – 100 Greatest Psychedelic Records)
Jake Kennedy (author of Joy Division & The Making of Unknown Pleasures)
Joel McIver (author of No-One Knows: The Queens of the Stone Age Story, Justice For All: The Truth About Metallica and many other books)
Mick Middles (co-author of The Fall)
 Ben Myers (author of Richard, contributor to NME, Mojo, The Guardian)
Graham Needham (author)
David Noades (freelance writer and contributor to The 365 Days Project)
Alan Parker (author of Vicious: Too Fast to Live, John Lennon and the FBI Files and The Clash: Rat Patrol From Fort Bragg)
Mark Paytress (author of Bolan: The Rise and Fall of a 20th Century Superstar, BowieStyle, Break It Up: Patti Smith, Horses & The Remaking of Rock'n'Roll, Vicious: The Art of Dying Young, Siouxsie and the Banshees: The Authorised Biography, I Was There: Gigs That Changed the World, The Rolling Stones: Off the Record, Classic Albums: The Rise and Fall of Ziggy Stardust & the Spiders from Mars and Radiohead: The Complete Guide to Their Music)
Bob Solly (author of Record Collector – 100 Greatest Rock'N'Roll Records)
Ian Peel (author of Music on the Internet, The Unknown Paul McCartney and The Rough Guide to eBay)
Martin Popoff (author of The Collector's Guide to Heavy Metal and The Top 500 Heavy Metal Albums of All Time)
Mark Prendergast (author of The Ambient Century: From Mahler to Moby – The Evolution of Sound in the Electronic Age)
David Quantick (author of Revolution: The Making of The Beatles' White Album)
John Reed (author of Paul Weller: My Ever Changing Moods)
John Robb (author of The Stone Roses and the Resurrection of British Pop and Punk Rock: An Oral History)
Ken Sharp (co-author of Eric Carmen: Marathon Man)
Ian Shirley (author of Can Rock And Roll Save the World? An Illustrated History of Music and Comics, Bauhaus: Dark Entries and Meet The Residents: America's Most Eccentric Band)
Bob Stanley (musician with Saint Etienne, and author)
Jonny Trunk (author of The Music Library: Graphic Art and Sound)
Richie Unterberger (author of Eight Miles High: Folk-Rock's Flight from Haight-Ashbury to Woodstock)
John Van der Kiste (co-author of Beyond the Summertime: The Mungo Jerry story, sole author, "Roy Wood" and "Jeff Lynne")
Charles Waring (writer for Blues & Soul and Mojo magazines)
Brett Callwood (author of Sonically Speaking and The Stooges: A Journey Through the Michigan Underworld)

References

External links

R.C's Rare Record Price Guide
Worldwide Record Collector Fair Organizers

Music magazines published in the United Kingdom
Magazines established in 1980
Monthly magazines published in the United Kingdom
Magazines published in London